Chatmoss is a census-designated place (CDP) in Henry County, Virginia, United States. The population was 1,698 at the 2010 census, down slightly from the 1,742 reported in 2000. It is part of the Martinsville Micropolitan Statistical Area.

History

Chatmoss takes its name from a 2,700-acre (11 km2) Hairston family plantation on the site, which was later incorporated into a larger country club building on the site.  That name probably derives from "Chat Moss", a large area of peat bog near Manchester, UK. In turn, that bog may be named after St Chad, or even from the Celtic word ced, meaning wood. Alternatively it may be an Old English personal name and mos,  meaning "swamp."  Low-lying areas around Chatmoss were boggy wetlands prone to flooding from Leatherwood Creek before mitigation by several dams.

The Hairston family owned many plantations scattered across the South, including plantations in North Carolina, Tennessee, Mississippi and Virginia. The family's Henry County plantations included still extant Beaver Creek Plantation and Hordsville, as well as plantations at Marrowbone, Magna Vista, Leatherwood, Camp Branch and Shawnee, which are no longer standing. The Chatmoss property was long owned by Harden Hairston, who inherited it, but it was later sold by a descendant to the developers of the country club on the site.

Geography
Chatmoss is located at  (36.679666, −79.805641).

According to the United States Census Bureau, the CDP has a total area of 5.4 square miles (13.9 km2), of which, 5.3 square miles (13.9 km2) of it is land and 0.04 square miles (0.1 km2) of it (0.37%) is water.

Demographics
As of the census of 2000, there were 1,742 people, 678 households, and 549 families residing in the CDP. The population density was 325.4 people per square mile (125.7/km2). There were 715 housing units at an average density of 133.6/sq mi (51.6/km2). The racial makeup of the CDP was 80.31% White, 15.67% African American, 0.17% Native American, 1.78% Asian, 1.15% from other races, and 0.92% from two or more races. Hispanic or Latino of any race were 6.08% of the population.

There were 678 households, out of which 32.3% had children under the age of 18 living with them, 72.6% were married couples living together, 5.8% had a female householder with no husband present, and 18.9% were non-families. 17.1% of all households were made up of individuals, and 7.1% had someone living alone who was 65 years of age or older. The average household size was 2.57 and the average family size was 2.88.

In the CDP, the population was spread out, with 22.8% under the age of 18, 5.3% from 18 to 24, 25.0% from 25 to 44, 33.6% from 45 to 64, and 13.3% who were 65 years of age or older. The median age was 43 years. For every 100 females, there were 94.4 males. For every 100 females age 18 and over, there were 93.8 males.

The median income for a household in the CDP was $58,929, and the median income for a family was $67,431. Males had a median income of $46,146 versus $27,031 for females. The per capita income for the CDP was $36,777. About 2.3% of families and 2.3% of the population were below the poverty line, including 1.8% of those under age 18 and 5.1% of those age 65 or over.

References

Census-designated places in Henry County, Virginia
Census-designated places in Virginia
Martinsville, Virginia micropolitan area